The badminton competition at the 2021 Southeast Asian Games took place at Bac Giang Gymnasium in Bắc Giang, Vietnam from 16 to 22 May 2022. 7 events were featured similarly to the past edition.

Medal table

Medalists

References

External links
  

2021 Southeast Asian Games events
Badminton at the 2021 Southeast Asian Games
2021
2022 in badminton
Badminton tournaments in Vietnam